"Kano Mia Efhi" (Greek: Κάνω μια ευχή; English: I make a wish) is a song by the Greek Cypriot singer Ivi Adamou from her second album San Ena Oniro, written by Meth and Megeda and produced by Meth. It was released on 21 June 2011.

Track listing
Digital download
"Kano Mia Efhi (feat. Daddy Nek)" – 3:29

Credits and personnel
 Lead vocals – Ivi Adamou
 Producers – Meth
 Lyrics – Meth, Mageda
 Label: Sony Music Greece/Day 1

Music video
It was announced that the video clip will be first seen in Sony Ericsson Greece's Facebook page. A teaser of the video clip was released on 19 July 2011. The video was published on VEVO on 29 July 2011.

Release history

References 

2011 singles
Ivi Adamou songs
2011 songs
Songs written by Dimitri Stassos